The "seventy-four" was a type of two-decked sailing ship of the line, which nominally carried 74 guns. It was developed by the French navy in the 1740s, replacing earlier classes of 60- and 62-gun ships, as a larger complement to the recently-developed 64-gun ships. Impressed with the performance of several captured French seventy-fours, the British Royal Navy quickly adopted similar designs, classing them as third rates. The type then spread to the Spanish, Dutch, Danish and Russian navies.

The design was considered a good balance between firepower and sailing qualities. Hundreds of seventy-fours were constructed, becoming the dominant form of ship-of-the-line. They remained the mainstay of most major fleets into the early 19th century. From the 1820s, they began to be replaced by larger two-decked ships mounting more guns. However some seventy-fours remained in service until the late 19th century, when they were finally supplanted by ironclads.

Standardising on a common ship size was an appealing ideal for naval administrators and bureaucrats. Although the seventy-four was a common type, the ship classes were not identical, even within the same navy. In the period 1750–1790, seventy-fours could measure from just under 2,000 to 3,000 tons burthen. The armament could also vary considerably, with the lower deck mounting 24-pounder to 36-pounder long guns, and a variety of calibres (sometimes including a few carronades) used on the upper deck. Some seventy-fours of the Danish navy only carried 70 guns.

First 74-gun designs 
The first 74-gun ships were constructed by the French as they rebuilt their navy during the early years of the reign of Louis XV. The new ship type was a very large two-decker big enough to carry the largest common type of gun (36-pounders) on the lower gun deck, something only three-deckers had done earlier. This great firepower was combined with very good sailing qualities compared to both the taller three-deckers and the shorter old-style 70-gun two-deckers, making the 74 the perfect combination of the two. A disadvantage of the 74 was that it was relatively expensive to build and man compared to the older type of two-decker.

The 74-gun ship carried 28 (24-pounders- to 36-pounders) on the lower gun deck, 28–30 (18- to 24-pounders) on the upper gun deck, and 14–18 (6- to 12-pounders) on the upper works. Crew size was around 500 to 750 men depending on design, circumstances and nationality, with British ships tending to have smaller crews than other navies. The French had large and small seventy-fours, called "grand modèle" and "petite modèle", the waterline length of a "grand modèle" seventy-four could be up to 182 feet.

Given the construction techniques of the day, the seventy-four approached the limits of what was possible. Such long hulls made from wood had a tendency to flex and sag over time. Increased maintenance could counter this to some extent, but this was of course costly. This limited the success of the even bigger two-deck 80-gun ships that were built in small numbers after the seventy-four had been introduced. Three-deckers did not have the same problem due to their additional deck giving more rigidity.

The significance of the 74s however is hard to overstate, as shown by a summary of the ships of the line for all nations that were in commission at any time during the Revolutionary/Napoleonic Wars period.

1st & 2nd rates (130–90 guns) 156
3rd rate 74s (70–90 guns) 408
4th rate (60–68 guns) 199

74s in the Royal Navy 
The Royal Navy captured a number of the early French 74-gun ships during the War of the Austrian Succession (for example, captured at the first battle of Cape Finisterre in 1747) and the Seven Years' War and was greatly impressed by them compared to its own smallish 70-gun ships. As a result, it started building them in great numbers from about 1760, as did most other navies. Navies that were restricted by shallow waters, such as the Dutch and Scandinavian navies, at least early on tended to avoid the 74-gun ship to a certain degree due to its size and draught, preferring smaller two-deckers instead. Even so, the seventy-four was a standard feature in all European navies around 1800. Only a handful of 74-gun ships were commissioned into the United States Navy; the US Navy's early sea power concentrated on its frigates.

The type fell into disuse after the Napoleonic Wars, when improved building techniques made it possible to build even bigger two-deckers of 84 or even 90 guns without sacrificing hull rigidity.

The last seventy-four, the French Trafalgar veteran Duguay-Trouin, was scuttled in 1949. Her stern ornamentation is on display at the National Maritime Museum, Greenwich. In addition, dozens of ship models exist, produced as part of constructing the real ships, and thus believed accurate both externally and internally.

Classes

British 
  (7 ships)
  (2)
  (2)
  (5)
  (12)
 
  (4)
  (9)
  (5)
  (8)
  (6)
  (8)
  (4)
  (6)
  (6)
  (2)
  (2)
  (2)
  (2)
  (4)
  (8)
  (2)
  (40)
  (4)

French 
  (2 ships)
  (107)
 
  (3)
  (2)

Russian 
  (19 ships)
  (4)
  (7)
  (23)
  (11)
  (7)
  (25)

Venetian 
  (16 ships)
  (29)
  (1)
  (4)

Notes

References
 Glete, Jan, Navies and nations: Warships, navies and state building in Europe and America, 1500–1860. Almqvist & Wiksell International, Stockholm. 1993. 
 Ercole, Guido, Vascelli e fregate della Serenissima. Navi di linea della Marina veneziana 1652-1797. GMT, Trento. 2011.

Further reading 

 Jean Boudriot, transl. David Roberts, The Seventy-Four Gun Ship (Naval Institute Press, 1986) originally Le Vaisseau de 74 Canons, 1973. Four volumes document every aspect of the French 74, from shipyard construction techniques to handling under sail. Many large diagrams and drawings.

External links 
A seventy-four gun ship scaled model
A seventy-four gun ship model

Ships of the line
Ship of the line classes
Naval sailing ship types